Hidezumi Shirakata (born 6 September 1966) is a Japanese professional golfer.

Shirakata plays on the Japan Golf Tour, where he has won once.

Professional wins (9)

Japan Golf Tour wins (1)

Japan Challenge Tour wins (2)
1994 Kansai PGA Philanthropy
2011 Fuji Country Kani Club Challenge Cup

Other wins (5)
1994 Chushikoku Open
1996 Hero Indian Open
1997 Chushikoku Open
2003 Kyusyu Open
2006 Kyusyu Open

Japan PGA Senior Tour wins (1)
2019 Japan PGA Senior Championship

External links

Japanese male golfers
Japan Golf Tour golfers
Sportspeople from Fukuoka Prefecture
1966 births
Living people